Soul Trade is an original novel based on the U.S. television series Angel. Tagline: "The black market is trading on humanity."

Plot summary
Angel, better than most, understands the importance and meaning of the soul. Angel's soul have driven him on his journey of redemption. Now Angel discovers those who would pay for a soul.

Doyle, Cordelia, and Angel find a girl whose soul has been taken away from her.  It seems a soul trade is developing its own black market; the soul is an item of wealth to gamblers, junkies, and others in L.A.'s vast underworld. The soul of an innocent girl is a desirable item... until Angel appears on the scene, with a soul that is- literally- one-of-a-kind.

Continuity
Characters include: Angel, Cordelia and Doyle.
Supposed to be set early in Angel season 1, before the episode "Hero", but after "The Bachelor Party".
Doyle mentions that his ex-wife Harry dumped Richard since recent events.
After he meets the little girl, Angel is strongly reminded of his little sister Kathy, one of his first victims as Angelus.
When seeking information about the soul-eating demons the Kurgarru, Doyle initially suggests Angel contact Giles for information, but Angel asks Doyle to talk to Harry first as he is reluctant to contact anyone in Sunnydale unless he has to

Canonical issues

Angel books such as this one are not usually considered by fans as canonical. Some fans consider them stories from the imaginations of authors and artists, while other fans consider them as taking place in an alternative fictional reality. However unlike fan fiction, overviews summarising their story, written early in the writing process, were 'approved' by both Fox and Joss Whedon (or his office), and the books were therefore later published as officially Buffy/Angel merchandise.

External links

Reviews
Litefoot1969.bravepages.com - Review of this book by Litefoot
Teen-books.com - Reviews of this book
Shadowcat.name - Review of this book

2001 novels
Angel (1999 TV series) novels
2001 fantasy novels